Frankie Oviedo (born September 21, 1973) is a Colombian former footballer and coach who played for various clubs of Colombia, Venezuela and Mexico as a midfielder. He retired in 2009 to lead a youth football academy in Cali. He capped 20 matches with the national team.

In 2012, he joined Club Tijuana in Mexico as an assistant coach for the U-20 teams. He currently leads the Tijuana Femenil.

Titles

Personal life
Oviedo's daughter, Valentina Oviedo, who was born in Mexico City, plays for Tijuana in the Liga MX Femenil and is a member of the Colombia women's national under-20 football team.

References

External links
 

1973 births
Living people
Colombian footballers
Colombian expatriate footballers
Colombia international footballers
Categoría Primera A players
Liga MX players
América de Cali footballers
Boyacá Chicó F.C. footballers
Deportes Quindío footballers
Deportivo Táchira F.C. players
Club América footballers
Club Necaxa footballers
C.F. Pachuca players
Club Puebla players
Expatriate footballers in Mexico
Expatriate footballers in Venezuela
2000 CONCACAF Gold Cup players
Association football midfielders
Footballers from Cali